Slon may refer to:
 
Elephant in many Slavic languages
Slon, a village in Cerașu Commune, Prahova County, Romania
Slon.ru, a Russian magazine
Russian abbreviation of the Solovki prison camp (Соловецкий лагерь особого назначения)
Slon (album) an album by the Chicago Underground Trio

People with the surname
Claudio Slon (1943–2002), Brazilian jazz drummer
Sidney Slon (1910-1995), Radio script writer for many popular radio shows such as The Shadow and Dick Tracy
Viviane Slon, paleogeneticist